Mythoplastoides is a genus of North American dwarf spiders that was first described by C. R. Crosby & S. C. Bishop in 1933.

Species
 it contains two species:
Mythoplastoides erectus (Emerton, 1915) – USA
Mythoplastoides exiguus (Banks, 1892) (type) – USA

See also
 List of Linyphiidae species (I–P)

References

Araneomorphae genera
Linyphiidae
Spiders of the United States